Marco Di Fatta (born 3 March 1988) is an Italian footballer.

Club career

Calcio Catania
Di Fatta began his youth career with Sicilian club, Calcio Catania, after being born and raised in Palermo, Sicily. He spent many years within the club's youth ranks and graduated from the youth academy in June 2007. Di Fatta never made a senior appearance for Catania prior to being transferred.

Co-ownership Deals
In July 2007 Di Fatta was transferred to Sansovino on a co-ownership deal, where he spent the 2007-08 statistical season. He went on to make 25 appearances for the club prior to his return to Catania on 1 July 2008 after the resolution of the joint ownership. He was then sold to A.C. Pistoiese on another co-ownership deal that same month. After just seven appearances with the club, Di Fatta suffered a season-long injury which ruled him out of the remainder of the 2008-09 Lega Pro season. His contract was again resolved in favor of Catania the following summer, and the 50% of his contract was sold once more.

In July 2009, Di Fatta joined A.S. Taranto Calcio on a similar co-ownership arrangement. He joined the club alongside fellow Catania teammates Raffaele Imparato (loan) and Adriano Mezavilla (co-ownership). Another serious injury ruled Di Fatta out for much of the 2009–10 season as well, and Taranto opted to loan the player out. On 4 January 2010, he was loaned to Potenza S.C. on a 6-month loan deal, in hope of a career-revival. The injury, however, limited the player to just 2 league appearances for the club. At the end of season Calcio Catania and A.S. Taranto Calcio failed to agree on a price for the contracts of Mezavilla and Di Fatta, and therefore, on 25 June both clubs submitted their bids in sealed envelopes to the Lega Calcio. On the next day, the Lega Calcio announced that Taranto purchased Mezavilla outright and Di Fatta returned to Catania.

S.S. Milazzo
In July 2010 Di Fatta was then sold on yet another co-ownership agreement to Lega Pro Seconda Divisione side, Milazzo, along with Nicola Lanzolla, Rocco Benci, and Antonio Carrozza. Di Fatta's re-occurring injury troubles left the player with just 4 appearances for the fourth division side, and on 1 July 2011, Di Fatta was released. He has since remained unemployed.

References

External links
 Calciatori.com Profile 
 
 Football.it Profile 

Italian footballers
Catania S.S.D. players
A.C. Sansovino players
U.S. Pistoiese 1921 players
Taranto F.C. 1927 players
Potenza S.C. players
Association football defenders
Footballers from Palermo
1988 births
Living people